Genesee is an unincorporated community and a census-designated place (CDP) located in and governed by Jefferson County, Colorado, United States. The CDP is a part of the Denver–Aurora–Lakewood, CO Metropolitan Statistical Area. The population of the Genesee CDP was 3,609 at the United States Census 2010. The Golden post office (Zip code 80401) serves the area.

Geography
Genesse is located in the foothills of the Front Range.

Demographics

Attractions
Genesee Park, in the Denver Mountain Parks system.

Education
Genesee is served by the Jefferson County Public Schools.

See also

Outline of Colorado
Index of Colorado-related articles
State of Colorado
Colorado cities and towns
Colorado census designated places
Colorado counties
Jefferson County, Colorado
List of statistical areas in Colorado
Front Range Urban Corridor
North Central Colorado Urban Area
Denver-Aurora-Boulder, CO Combined Statistical Area
Denver-Aurora-Broomfield, CO Metropolitan Statistical Area

References

External links

Genesee Foundation

Census-designated places in Jefferson County, Colorado
Census-designated places in Colorado
Denver metropolitan area